Banu Muharib was an Arab tribe during the Islamic prophet Muhammad's era. During the Invasion of Thi Amr  Muhammad ordered a military raid against them. He ordered his men to raid the Banu Muharib and Banu Talabah tribes after he received intelligence that they were allegedly going to raid the outskirts of Medina

Ghwarath ibn al-Harith (also known as Du'thar ibn al-Harith) is from this tribe.

After the Muslim Conquest of Iraq the tribe settled in al-Kufah

See also
List of expeditions of Muhammad

References

Arabian tribes that interacted with Muhammad